Grumăzești is a commune in Neamț County, Western Moldavia, Romania. It is composed of four villages: Curechiștea, Grumăzești, Netezi and Topolița.

References

Communes in Neamț County
Localities in Western Moldavia